Crystal Peaks is a shopping centre and retail park in Sheffield, South Yorkshire, England. Established in 1988, the centre attracts around 11 million visitors a year.

Facilities
The centre has an indoor market operated by Sheffield City Council, a medical centre, veterinary surgery and a range of other facilities and services. The centre also has a Sainsbury's supermarket which now includes an Argos.

The lower Ground floor contains many food outlets including a McDonald's and a Costa

The retail park is located within walking distance, and hosts brands such as TK Maxx and Boots, as well as two catering units and a gym.

In recent years, bee hives have been sited on the roof of the shopping centre to help combat the decline of the local bee population. Other environmental projects that the centre has taken part in include the installation of swift boxes on the building, bee-friendly planting, a nature reserve and the support of Beighton (a local village) in the Britain in Bloom and Yorkshire in Bloom competitions.

Crystal Peaks also has a dedicated 'charity of the year'. In 2010, the centre raised over £8,000 for Bluebell Wood Children's Hospice. The centre's adopted charity for 2011 was Macmillan Cancer Support.

Interior shots of the shopping centre are used in the 2010 film Four Lions, in which a character is depicted as working as a shopping centre security guard.

History
Crystal Peaks first opened in 1988, being developed in phases. Opening ceremonies attracted large crowds to see Roland Rat and then Eddie "The Eagle" Edwards do the honours. To much applause, Olympic ski jumper Edwards performed a stunt on wires from the top of the atrium above the escalators.

Originally, the central areas inside the shopping centre included a waterfall, a river, clock tower elevator and a model railway. Sheffield's first ten screen cinema, a UCI, was also part of the complex, although this closed in 2003 due to competition from newer, larger cinemas in the city.

Since opening, the centre has developed substantially; a new mall was added to the West of the centre in 1998. Sainsbury's was relocated to the lower mall in 2006, and further extensions to the North Walk and East Mall were completed in early 2007.

Public transport

Bus station
Crystal Peaks bus station is located off of Peaks Mount on the western side of the shopping centre, with a direct entrance into the shopping centre. The bus station is located nearby to the Crystal Peaks tram stop, and together provide a public transport hub for south-east Sheffield.

Services
, the stand allocation is:

Tram stop
Crystal Peaks tram stop is located in Waterthorpe on the Sheffield Supertram system, and serves Crystal Peaks Shopping Centre and Retail Park, Drakehouse Retail Park, and Waterthorpe. It consists of two platforms.

Crystal Peaks is also served by the Beighton/Drake House Lane tram stop, which is located behind the "Green" car park.

References

External links
 Official website
 Crystal Peaks Shopping Centre on CompletelyRetail

Shopping centres in South Yorkshire
Buildings and structures in Sheffield
Shopping malls established in 1988